George Robert Blakey (born January 7, 1936) is an American  attorney and law professor. He is best known for his work in connection with drafting the Racketeer Influenced and Corrupt Organizations Act and for scholarship on that subject.

Education and family
Blakey, an American Catholic of Irish descent, was born in Burlington, North Carolina. He graduated from the University of Notre Dame in 1957, earning a degree in philosophy with honors, and was elected to Phi Beta Kappa. He then attended Notre Dame Law School, where he was an associate editor of the Notre Dame Law Review and was awarded a J.D. 1960.

In April 1958, during his first year of law school, Blakey married Elaine Menard, a graduate of St. Mary's College. The couple had 8 children, and remained married until her death in 2002. He is the father of John Robert Blakey, a United States District Judge of the United States District Court for the Northern District of Illinois, who was formerly chief of the Special Prosecutions Bureau for the Cook County State's Attorney and a special assistant attorney in the United States District Court for the Northern District of Illinois.

RICO and other legislation 
Under the close supervision of Senator John Little McClellan, the Chairman of the Committee for which he worked, Blakey drafted the "RICO Act," Title IX of the Organized Crime Control Act of 1970, signed into law by Richard M. Nixon. While in law school, Blakey edited a student note on the unsuccessful prosecution of attendees at the Apalachin Meeting, which first sparked his interest in organized crime; he also wrote a note that analyzed civil liberties in the union movement. In 1960, after law school, Blakey joined the United States Department of Justice under its Honor Program, and he became a Special Attorney in the Organized Crime and Racketeering Section of the Criminal Division of the Department. After Robert F. Kennedy became Attorney General, the Department began a major effort to bring criminal prosecutions against organized crime members, corrupt political figures, and faithless union officials. The Section assigned Blakey to the effort. He remained at Justice until 1964, leaving the summer after the November 1963 assassination of John F. Kennedy.

Subsequently, numerous states passed racketeering legislation with Blakey's assistance modeled on the federal statute. In addition, under the close supervision of McClellan, Blakey also drafted Title III on wiretapping of the Omnibus Crime Control and Safe Streets Act of 1968. Numerous states, too, have wiretapping legislation modeled on the federal statute, and Blakey aided in those efforts. It is suspected, especially among those in the Italian American community, that Blakey intentionally arrived at the acronym RICO as a left-handed slight at the Italian American ethnicity, since the 'mafia' was a principal target of the law. "Rico" is a well known nickname for "Enrico," the Italian version for Henry and a popular name among Italian American immigrants. Additionally, "Rico" was the name of an Italian American mobster in the 1930 gangster movie "Little Caesar," from which Blakey may have derived the name.

Assassinations committee
Blakey was a Notre Dame law professor from 1964 to 1969, when he returned to Washington as Chief Counsel of  Subcommittee on Criminal Laws and Procedures of the Senate Judiciary Committee. John Little McClellan was the Chairman of the Subcommittee. Blakey credits the success of his drafting work to the dedication to needs of law enforcement, the understanding of the drafting and the processing of legislation, and basic sense of fairness of McClellan as well as the extraordinary confidence other members of the Senate placed in McClellan. Only he could have seen to the successful completion of Blakey's handiwork; if Blakey was its draftsman, McClellan was its architect and master builder.

During 1967, he was a Consultant on organized crime to the President's Commission on Law Enforcement and the Administration of Justice; Lyndon B. Johnson created the Commission to examine crime in America. It recommended, among other measures, new racketeering and wiretapping legislation.

Blakey was Chief Counsel and Staff Director to the U.S. House Select Committee on Assassinations from 1977 to 1979, which investigated the assassinations of John F. Kennedy and Martin Luther King Jr. under the direction of Louis Stokes. Blakey also helped Stokes draft the President John F. Kennedy Assassination Records Collection Act of 1992. He and Richard Billings, the editor of the final report of the Committee, would later write two books about the assassination.

Supreme Court appearances 
In Blakey's first appearance before the United States Supreme Court, he filed a brief on behalf of the Attorneys General of Massachusetts and Oregon and the National District Attorneys Association in the case of Berger v. New York (1967), which dealt with wiretapping. He argued on behalf of the Securities Investor Protection Corporation in what became Holmes v. SIPC (1992); he argued on behalf of anti-abortion activist Joseph Scheidler in what became Scheidler v. National Organization for Women (2006), and he argued on behalf of the beneficiaries of insurance policies in what became Humana, Inc. v. Forsyth (1999).

Teaching
Blakey served as a law professor at Notre Dame Law School from 1964 to 1969. From 1973 to 1980, he served as a law professor at Cornell Law School, and was director of the Cornell Institute on Organized Crime. In 1980, Blakey returned to teaching law at Notre Dame, and in 1985 was named the William J. and Dorothy K. O'Neill Professor of Law there.

In December 2013, the 80 year old retired professor Blakey agreed to accept censure by the D.C. Office of Bar Counsel related to charges made against him for disclosing confidential documents of the General Electric company. Washington D.C. whistleblower attorney Lynne Bernabei, and Blakey's former student (and former General Electric attorney) Adriana Koeck, brought the charges with respect to internal General Electric documents that they had shared with Blakey, and that he subsequently gave to a reporter for The New York Times as well as to the United States Securities and Exchange Commission and federal prosecutors. Blakey told the Bar Counsel office that he believed that the documents could be disclosed because they were covered by a crime/fraud exception to rules forbidding lawyers from disclosing clients' confidential information.

Selected publications

Notes

References

Further reading 
 
 
 

1936 births
Living people
American people of Irish descent
People from Burlington, North Carolina
Catholics from North Carolina
Cornell University faculty
Irish-American culture in Indiana
Non-fiction writers about organized crime in the United States
Notre Dame Law School alumni
Notre Dame Law School faculty
Researchers of the assassination of John F. Kennedy
University of Notre Dame alumni
University of Notre Dame faculty
United States Senate lawyers
United States Department of Justice lawyers